Vlasta Depetrisová (20 December 1920 – 23 October 2003) was a Czech female international table tennis player.

Table tennis career
From 1936 to 1948 she won fourteen medals in singles, doubles, and team events in the World Table Tennis Championships.

Her married name was Vlasta Pokorná.

The fourteen World Championship medals included four gold medals; one in the singles at the 1949 World Table Tennis Championships, one in the women's team event and two  in the doubles with Věra Votrubcová.

She also won an English Open title.

See also
 List of table tennis players
 List of World Table Tennis Championships medalists

References

  

1920 births
2003 deaths
Czech female table tennis players
Czechoslovak table tennis players
Sportspeople from Plzeň